Aureoboletus is a genus of bolete fungi in the family Boletaceae. It was circumscribed by Czech mycologist Zdeněk Pouzar in 1957. A taxonomic monograph was published in 2010 by Wolfgang Klofac.

Species
Species from Index Fungorum as of 2020:

References

External links

Boletaceae
Boletales genera